The Screen Award Special Jury Award is a special award conducted by the Star Screen Awards to recognise a great performance by an artist in the previous year. The winners are listed below:-

See also
 Star Screen Awards
 Bollywood
 Cinema of India

References

Screen Awards